Jean-Paul Daoust (born January 30, 1946) is a Canadian poet. He won the Governor General's Award for French-language poetry at the 1990 Governor General's Awards for Les Cendres bleues.

Life
Daoust has published thirty collections of poetry since 1976, and two novels. He contributed to many poetry magazines, and edited the journal Estuary from 1993 to 2003. He is a member of the Quebec Writers Union.

He is openly gay.

Works

 Oui, cher, récit, Montréal, éd. Cul Q, 1976 
Chaises longues, livre-objet, Montréal, éd. Cul Q, 1977, 
 Portraits d'intérieur, Trois-Rivières, éd. APLM, 1981
 Poèmes de Babylone, Trois-Rivières, éd. Écrits des Forges, 1982; Poemas de Babilonia / Poèmes de Babylone, poésie, Trois-Rivières, éd. Écrits des Forges et éd. Mantis Editores (Mexique), 2007, 
 Black Diva, Montréal, Lèvres Urbaines no 5, 1983; 
 Soleils d'acajou, Montréal, éd. Nouvelle Optique, 1983
 Taxi, Trois-Rivières, éd. Écrits des Forges, 1984 
 Dimanche après-midi, Trois-Rivières, éd. Écrits des Forges, 1985
 La Peau du cœur et son opéra, Saint-Lambert, éd. Le Noroît, 1985
 Les Garçons magiques, Montréal, éd. VLB, 1986
 Suite contemporaine, Trois-Rivières, éd. Écrits des Forges, 1987
 Les Cendres bleues, Trois-Rivières, éd. Écrits des Forges 1990; réédition, Paris, éd. Artalect, 1992 ; poésie, livre de poche, Trois-Rivières, éd. Écrits des Forges, 2015 ; 6e édition,.
 Rituels d'Amérique, illustrations de Jocelyne Aird-Bélanger, Val-David, éd. Incidit, 1990 
 Les Chambres de la mer, Bruxelles, éd. L'Arbre à paroles, 1991 
 Les Poses de la lumière, Montréal, Le Noroît, 1991 
 Du dandysme, Laval, éd. Trois, 1991, 1991 
 Lèvres ouverte, Trois-Rivières, Lèvres urbaines no 24, 1993 
 L'Amérique, poème en cinémascope, photographies de Robert Gauthier, Montréal, éd. XYZ, 1993 ; réédition, éd. XYZ, coll. « Romanichels plus », 2003
 Poèmes faxés, en collaboration avec Louise Desjardins et Mona Latif-Ghattas, Trois-Rivières, éd. Écrits des Forges, 1994
 Fusions, illustrations de Jocelyne Aird-Bélanger, Val-David, éd. Incidit, 1994
 111 Wooster street', Montréal, poésie, éd. VLD, 1996
 Taxi pour Babylone, Trois-Rivières, éd. Écrits des Forges/L'Orange Bleue, 1996
 Les Saisons de l'ange, Montréal, Le Noroît, 1997
 Le Désert rose, Montréal, éd. Alain Stanké, 1999
 Les Saisons de l'ange II, Montréal, Le Noroît, 1999 
 Le Poème déshabillé, collectif, éd. L’Interligne, 2000 
 Les Versets amoureux, Trois-Rivières, éd. Écrits des Forges, 2001; éd. Phi, 2002,
 Roses labyrinthes, Paris, éd. Le Castor astral, 2002
 Cobra et Colibri, Montréal, éd. Le Noroît, 2006
 Cinéma gris, Montréal, éd. Triptyque, 2006
 Fleurs lascives, éd. Écrits des Forges, Trois-Rivières, 2007
 Élégie Nocturne, musique de Manu Trudel, Montréal, éd. Planette Rebelle (Collection Hôtel central), 2008
 Ailleurs - Épisode I: Charleville-Mézières 2008 : une année en poésie, poésie (collectif), Charleville-Mézières, éd. Musée Rimbaud, 2009,
 Le Vitrail brisé, poésie, Trois-Rivières, éd. Écrits des Forges, 2009, - Grand prix Québecor du Festival international de la poésie 2009
 Ailleurs - Épisode II : Charleville-Mézières 2009 : une année en poésie, poésie (collectif), Charleville-Mézières, éd. Musée Rimbaud, 2010,
 Carnets de Moncton : scènes de la vie ordinaire, Moncton, éd. Perce-Neige, 2010.
 TGV Les Ailleurs (Suite carolomacérienne) : livre-objet (tirage limité, réalisé par Aurélie Derhee, illustré de calligraphies de Jean-Christophe Husson), Charleville-Mézières, éd. Lili éditions et Musée Rimbaud, 2010.
 Libellules, couleuvres et autres merveilles..., Trois-Rivières, éd.d'Art Le Sabord, 2011.
 Sand Bar, Montréal, Lévesque éditeur; The Sand Bar/Sand Bar (traduction par Susan Ouriou et Christelle Morelli) 2011, récits, Toronto, Quattro Books, 2013.
 Odes Radiophoniques, Montréal, éd. Poètes de Brousse, 2012.
 Lèvres Ouvertes, Trois-Rivières, éd. Écrits des Forges, 2012.
 111 Wooster street, livre de poche, Montréal, éd. Poètes de Brousse, 2013, 2eédition.
 Odes Radiophoniques II, Montréal, éd. Poètes de Brousse, 2014.
 L'Aile de la roue, Sainte-Mélanie, éd. Création Bell'Arte, 2014.
 Le Dandy, Saint-Sauveur, éd. de la Grenouillère, 2014.
 Odes Radiophoniques III, Montréal, éd. Poètes de Brousse, 2015.
 Sexe Glamour, Châtelineau (Belgique) et Trois-Rivières, éd. Le Taillis Prés (Belgique) fondées par Yves Namur en coédition avec les Écrits des Forges, collection "erOtik" dirigée par Eric Brogniet, 2015.

Works in English

References

1946 births
Living people
Canadian male poets
20th-century Canadian poets
20th-century Canadian male writers
21st-century Canadian poets
Canadian male novelists
20th-century Canadian novelists
21st-century Canadian novelists
Canadian male short story writers
20th-century Canadian short story writers
21st-century Canadian short story writers
Canadian poets in French
Writers from Quebec
Canadian gay writers
Canadian LGBT poets
Canadian LGBT novelists
Governor General's Award-winning poets
21st-century Canadian male writers
Gay poets
Gay novelists
21st-century Canadian LGBT people
20th-century Canadian LGBT people